Myrmica rubra, also known as the common red ant or erroneously the European fire ant, is a species of ant of the genus Myrmica, found all over Europe and is now invasive in some parts of North America and Asia. It is mainly red in colour, with slightly darker pigmentation on the head. These ants live under stones and fallen trees, and in  soil. They are aggressive, often attacking rather than running away, and are equipped with a stinger, though they lack the ability to spray formic acid like the genus Formica.

This species is very similar to M. ruginodis, but M. rubra  is the commoner of the two.

The larvae of the butterflies Phengaris alcon (Alcon blue) and P. teleius (scarce large blue) use M. rubra as their primary host.

Distribution and habitat 
This is one of the most common and widespread Myrmica species of the Palaearctic. It occurs in the region stretching from Portugal to East Siberia (as far as Transbaikalia), and from northern Greece to the forest-tundra zone in the North. It is also colonizing North America, where it is considered a pest species.

These ants are very common in Europe and the UK and live in meadows and gardens. They live on a diet of honeydew excreted by aphids and feed on many types of insect and other invertebrates. They will attack any creature that disturbs their nest, but are not as aggressive as the red imported fire ant. They also consume pollen, a phenomenon rarely documented in ants of the temperate zone.

Behavior 
This ant's colonies have a polygyne form and can include up to one hundred queens per nest. These queens will have gathered together after their nuptial flight, formed a nest and laid their eggs in it. The species is also polydomous, with many nest sites per individual colony. The queens can live up to fifteen years. Nuptial flights take place normally in late July to mid-August in Europe. Hundreds of young queens and males take to the air to mate together. Afterwards, the males die and the queens shed their wings to make a new colony. No nuptial flights have been witnessed yet from this species where it is living in North America, however male-only mating swarms have been recorded in Newfoundland, Canada.

The ants explore the surrounding area around their nest and look for materials, both plant and animal, to feed their colonies. They choose locations randomly, and so this species does not create cemeteries.

References

External links

Ant wiki information on Myrmica rubra.
Brief report from the University of Maine on the management of Myrmica rubra in the U.S., with extensive additional references

Myrmica
Hymenoptera of Europe
Ants described in 1758
Taxa named by Carl Linnaeus